Benjamín Rollheiser (born 24 March 2000) is an Argentine professional footballer who plays as a forward for Estudiantes de La Plata.

Club career
Rollheiser had a short stint with Estudiantes' youth between 2010 and 2011, prior to playing for hometown team Deportivo Sarmiento; where he'd appear in Torneo Argentino C. He signed to the ranks of River Plate in 2014. In April 2019, a new contract was signed with them. Rollheiser was promoted into senior football ahead of the 2019–20 campaign, netting in pre-season friendlies in the United States with Ventura County Fusion (2) and Guadalajara. On 16 July, Rollheiser made his pro bow in a Copa Argentina win over Primera B Nacional's Gimnasia y Esgrima; converting the decisive spot-kick as River won on penalties.

International career
Rollheiser represented Argentina at U17 level, notably winning three caps at the 2017 South American Championship in Chile. He has also trained with their senior team.

Career statistics
.

References

External links

2000 births
Living people
Argentine footballers
People from Coronel Suárez Partido
Argentine people of Volga German descent
Argentine sportspeople of Paraguayan descent
Argentina youth international footballers
Sportspeople from Buenos Aires Province
Association football forwards
Torneo Argentino C players
Club Atlético River Plate footballers
Estudiantes de La Plata footballers